Breyton Paulse (born 25 April 1976 in De Keur, Koue Bokkeveld) is a South African former rugby union player who played on the wing for the national team, the Springboks, from 1999 to 2007. He played 64 test matches for South Africa, scoring 26 tries.

Early life
In his youth, in addition to rugby, he participated in cricket, soccer, and athletics, representing Boland in the 200m and 400m sprints. The farmer who employed his parents recognized his talent for rugby, and to nurture it, paid his tuition fees to attend Stellenbosch University, which has produced many Springbok rugby players.

Rugby career
Paulse garnered attention almost from the start of his top-flight rugby career with a hat-trick of tries in his first Currie Cup match in 1996, and made his debut for the Springboks in 1999. In his first appearance for the Springboks against Italy, he scored a hat-trick. After scoring his third try that day, he performed his trademark flick flack, a cartwheel followed by a back flip, which he continued to perform after particularly special tries.

At the end of the 2000 domestic season, he became the first player of color to be named South African Rugby Player of the Year, capping a season in which he scored two tries in Western Province's win over Natal in the Currie Cup final 

Paulse moved to France for the 2005–2006 season and played for Clermont Auvergne in the Top 14. He remained eligible for Springboks selection, as SA Rugby abandoned its past policy of requiring that Springbok players play domestic rugby in South Africa. Springboks coach Jake White indeed selected him for the 2005 Tri Nations, and started him in South Africa's first three matches. Paulse scored an important try in South Africa's series-opening 22–16 win over Australia. However, in the Springboks' third match (against Australia), Paulse received a three-week suspension for kicking Australian prop Al Baxter.

In the end of 2006, Paulse was picked by the Stormers franchise to be part of their team for the 2007 Super 14 where he strengthened his chances to once again don the Springboks colors.

He was selected for the squad that was present at the 2003 Rugby World Cup finals, but was only selected to the 2007 Rugby World Cup finals, as a reserve player.

His last appearance in the green and gold was against New Zealand at Christchurch in 2007 at the age of 31.

International statistics

Test Match Record

P = Games Played, W = Games Won, D = Games Drawn, L = Games Lost, Tri = Tries Scored, Pts = Points Scored

Test tries (26)

Stance on Quotas
Breyton Paulse has spoken out against the use of racial quotas to diversify South African rugby, saying, "It is a big degradation for the players...[it] nearly broke me", after Springbok rugby coach Nick Mallet described his selection in the 1999 World Cup Squad as "merit with bias". Despite this knock to his confidence, he went on to become one of South Africa's most capped players and leading try scorers by the time he retired.

Honours 
Western Province
Currie Cup: 1997, 2000, 2001
South Africa
Tri Nations: 2004

See also
List of South Africa national rugby union players – Springbok no. 647

References

External links 

South Africa caps, Part 1 (sporting-heroes.net)
South Africa caps, Part 2 (sporting-heroes.net)
South Africa caps, Part 3 (sporting-heroes.net)

1976 births
Living people
Cape Coloureds
South African rugby union players
South Africa international rugby union players
Stormers players
Western Province (rugby union) players
Rugby union wings
ASM Clermont Auvergne players
South Africa international rugby sevens players
Male rugby sevens players
Rugby union players from the Western Cape